Avangard Budy is a bandy club from Budy in Kharkiv Raion, Ukraine. The club colours are yellow, blue and black and the home games are played at Budy stadium, at Palace of Sport in Kharkiv and at "Saltivsky Lid" in Kharkiv.

Avangard Budy won the Ukrainian championship in 2013. They also won the Ukrainian championship five times in the era of Ukrainian SSR.

Sources

Bandy clubs in Ukraine
Sport in Kharkiv
Bandy clubs in the Soviet Union
Bandy clubs established in 1930